Nicolas Ferrial (1479–1536), also known as Le Févrial or Triboulet, was a jester for kings Louis XII and Francis I of France.

He appears in Book 3 of François Rabelais' Pantagrueline chronicles.  He also appears in Victor Hugo's Le Roi s'amuse and its operatic version, Giuseppe Verdi's Rigoletto, whose name is a blend of "Triboulet" and French rigoler (to laugh), intended to deflect the censorship that Hugo's work had received after its publication.

Biography 
Ferrial was born in France in 1479, and it is believed that he suffered from microcephaly, negatively impacting him neurologically and physically. Ferrial found purpose in life as the court jester for kings Louis XII and Francis I, who found him amusing in both speech and appearance. As "Triboulet," the jester was known for being extremely witty, often to the point where he would get in trouble with the royalty and nobles.

Once, Triboulet slapped Francis I on the buttocks, to the enjoyment of the surrounding nobles. The monarch lost his temper and threatened to execute Triboulet. The monarch calmed down, and promised to forgive Triboulet if he could think of an apology more insulting than the offending deed. Triboulet responded: "I'm so sorry, your majesty, that I didn't recognize you! I mistook you for the Queen!" Francis I ordered that he be put to death for once again violating his order not to make jokes about the queen and her courtiers. As he had served him particularly well for many years, the king granted Triboulet the right to choose how he would die. Triboulet said (translated from the original French): "Good sire, by Saint Goody Two Shoes and Saint Fatty, patrons of insanity, I ask to die from old age." Laughing, the king ordered that Triboulet not be executed but instead be banished from the realm. Triboulet actually did die of old age in 1536.

Famous quotes

Triboulet once came to the Monarch with a complaint. 
Triboulet: "A noble has threatened to hang me!"
The Monarch: "Don't worry! If he hangs you I'll have him beheaded fifteen minutes later."
Triboulet: "Well, would it be possible to behead him 15 minutes before?"

References

External links

1479 births
1536 deaths
Jesters
French comedians
French courtiers
Court of Francis I of France